The Parliamentary Standards Act 2009 (c.13) is an Act of the Parliament of the United Kingdom that entered into force in part on 21 July 2009, largely as a response to the Parliamentary expenses scandal. The Act was considered urgent by the government and therefore progressed through Parliament in less than one month.

The main provision of the Act was to create the Independent Parliamentary Standards Authority (IPSA), which would assume responsibility for the management of expenses and maintaining the Register of Members' Interests, largely as a result of the abolition of the Fees Office, which had attracted criticism over its role in the aforementioned scandal. The Act also created the office of the Commissioner of Parliamentary Investigations, who would, as part of the IPSA, oversee any investigations into MPs who he believed, or had reason to believe, had been paid an expenses claim that was not within the rules as set out in the Act and by the House of Commons, or the investigation of any MP who had failed to comply with the IPSA's code of conduct relating to financial interests. The government had attempted to legislate, as part of the original bill, that parliamentary privilege could not be used to prevent the IPSA from carrying out investigations against Members of Parliament, however this clause was voted down in the House of Commons by 250-247.

The Act also creates a criminal offence of providing false or misleading information for allowances claims, punishable by a fine and/or up to 12 months imprisonment.

References

External links
The Parliamentary Standards Act 2009, as amended from the National Archives.
The Parliamentary Standards Act 2009, as originally enacted from the National Archives.
Explanatory notes to the Parliamentary Standards Act 2009.

United Kingdom Acts of Parliament 2009